The School of English and American Studies (SEAS) of the Faculty of Humanities of the Eötvös Loránd University was founded in 1886 as Department of English Language and Literature and it is located in Rákóczi út in Józsefváros, Budapest, Hungary. Along with the Department of English of the University of Vienna, the School of English and American Studies is one of the biggest English departments in Central Europe.

History 

In 1886, Ágoston Trefort, the Minister of Religion and Education between 1882 and 1888 and the President of the Hungarian Academy of Sciences between 1885 and 1888, asked and commissioned Arthur Patterson to teach English language at the Hungarian Royal University.

In 1898, Arthur Yolland became the lector and later a teacher at the Hungarian Royal University.

In 1924, Antal Szerb, Hungarian writer, obtained a degree in teaching English and German languages at the Department of English Language and Literature.

In 1937, Miklós Szenczi established the lectorate that was financed by his own salary from 1941.

From 1945, László Országh taught at the department for a couple of years.

In 1947, the Institute of American and English Studies was established.

In 1947, Miklós Szenczi was appointed as the Director of the Department of English Language and Literature. However, he was removed from his position in 1949 due to political reason. In the same year, Miklós Szenczi was the appointed as the director of the institute. However, in 1948, the short-lived institute was dissolved due to political reasons.

Tibor Lutter was appointed as the head of the Department of English in 1949 and he led the department until 1956. In 1957, Miklós Szenczi was reinstated as the head of the department.

In 1990, the department was relocated to Ajtósi Dürer sor in Városliget, Zugló, Budapest.

After the end of communism in Hungary in 1989, Russian language was not anymore obligatory to learn at primary and secondaty schools. Therefore, the demand for English education increased exponentially. As a response for this demand, the Centre for English Teacher Training was established in 1990.

In 1990, Péter Medgyes founded the International Association of Teachers of English as a Foreign Language-Hungary in order to facilitate communication among teachers and share useful methods and techniques in teaching English.

In 1994, the School of English and American Studies was founded since the department was unable to handle the increasing number of students.

The early 2000s saw several changes at the Eötvös Loránd University. The Faculty of Teachers' Training College (in Hungarian: Tanárképző Főiskolai Kar) was dissolved and the SEAS continued the teacher education. First, a separate department was created for the teachers' education, led by Zsuzsanna Tóth. However, this separate department was dissolved and later the Department of English Language Pedagogy was founded.

In 2007, the School of English and American Studies was relocated to the Trefort Campus (Józsefváros) in Rákóczi út. In this way, all of the institutes of the Faculty of Humanities could be found at the Trefort Campus.

In 2011, the SEAS celebrated the 125th anniversary of its foundation by publishing a book entitled 125 éves az angol szak.

In 2013, anti-semitic stickers were placed by vandals on the doors of the instructors. The SEAS also expressed their concert with antisemitic provocation.

In 2017, the SEAS expressed its solidarity with the Central European University.

On 16 September 2022, Tibor Frank, former director of the SEAS and member of the Hungarian Academy of Sciences, died after a short illness.

Organisation 
The management consists of the director and two deputy directors.

Institute leadership

Directors of Institute

Departments 
There are 5 departments at the School of English and American Studies.

Programs 
There are one bachelor and two masters programmes at the SEAS.

Research

Publications

Journals 
overSEAS
The AnaChronist
angolPark
The Even Yearbook
The Odd Yearbook
Working Papers in Language Pedagogy (WoPaLP)

Festschrifts 
The following festschifts have been published:
At the Crossroads of Human Fate and History (Tibor Frank Festschrift, 2019)
Built upon His Rock: Writings in Honour of Péter Dávidházi (2018)
70 snippets to mark Ádám Nádasdy's 70th birthday (2017)
Heroes and Saints: Studies in Honour of Katalin Halácsy (2015)
Inspirations in Foreign Language Teaching: Studies in Language Pedagogy and Applied Linguistics in Honour of Péter Medgyes (2015)
Whack fol the dah: Writings for Ferenc Takács on his 65th Birthday (2013)
„Úgyse hiába”: Emlékezések és tanulmányok a műhelyalapító Géher István tiszteletére (2013)
VLlxx: Papers Presented to László Varga on his 70th Birthday (2013)
Essays for the 60th Birthday of Enikő Bollobás (2012)
Studies in Applied Linguistics: In Honour of Edit H. Kontra (2012)
Rare Device: Writings in Honour of Ágnes Péter (2011)
Who to Believe Expecting What: Writings for István Géher on his 70th Birthday (2010)
The Reality of Ruminations: Writings for Aladár Sarbu on his 70th Birthday (2010)
Emlékkönyv Frank Tibor 60. születésnapjára (2008)
The Metaphors of Sixty: Papers Presented on the Occasion of the *60th Birthday of Zoltán Kövecses (2006)
Kapu a tengerhez: Kortárs skót költők antológiája / A Gateway to the Sea: Anthology of Contemporary Scottish Poetry (1998)

Annual 

 DEAL 2020
 DEAL 2021

Research groups 
Equal chances in Language Learning Research Group
Budapest Research Centre for Lingusitic Theory (BRaCeLeT)
Experimental and theoretical investigation of vowel harmony patterns
Cultural Memory
Equal Rights in Language Learning (2007–2010)
Research into the Motivation of Hungarian Language Learners (2005–2007)

Researchers 

The following is a list of the researchers based on Google Scholar.

Department of American Studies (DAS), Department of English Applied Linguistics (DEAL), Department of English Language Pedagogy (DELP), Department of English Linguistics (DELG), Department of English Studies (DES)

Conferences 
The School of English and American Studies organises four-five conferences annually:

 Contemporary Crossroads (annual conference organised by the Department of English Applied Linguistics)
 Language Testing and Assessment Conference (annual conference organised by the Department of English Applied Linguistics)
 Össznyelvész (annual conference organised by the Department of English Linguistics)
 The Reel Eye (annual conference organised by the Department of English Studies)

Notable alumni 

Zsófia Bán, linguist
Kata Csizér, linguist
Zoltán Dörnyei, linguist
Kinga Fabó, poet
Tibor Frank, historian
András Gerevich, poet
Elemér Hankiss, sociologist
Judit Hidasi, linguist
Balázs Hidvéghi, politician
Judit Kormos, linguist
Zoltán Kövecses, linguist
Gábor Kósa, orientalist
Péter Medgyes, linguist
Anna Nagy, journalist
Ádám Nádasdy, linguist
Zsuzsa Rakovszky, writer
Ágnes Szokolszky, psychologist
István Tótfalusi, writer
Béla Tóth, athlete

References

External links 
 

Eötvös Loránd University
1886 establishments in Hungary
Józsefváros